Cedar Township is a township in Monroe County, Iowa, USA.

References

Townships in Monroe County, Iowa
Townships in Iowa